

The Racial Hygiene Association of New South Wales (RHA) was an Australian-based association founded in 1926 by Lillie Goodisson and Ruby Sophia Rich of the Women's Reform League. The association was originally known as the Racial Improvement Society until 1928.  It is now known as Family Planning NSW.

The association was involved in promoting sex education, preventing and eradicating venereal disease and the education of the public in eugenics. Goodisson served as general secretary for the association.  She advocated the selective breeding of future generations for the elimination of hereditary disease and defects and campaigned unsuccessfully for the segregation and sterilisation of the mentally deficient and for the introduction of pre-marital health examinations. Although Goodisson campaigned for her association's eugenics goals, her own interest in the topic is not clear; her main interests were in contraception and politics.  Goodisson's entry in the ADB hints at the reason for her interest. She married Albert Elliot Goodisson, business manager, on 11 June 1904 but he went to Batavia in September 1913 for 'health reasons'. He died on 4 February 1914, in the lunatic asylum where he had been committed for 'general paralysis' and derangement.  These are symptoms of tertiary syphilis - if Goodisson, a trained nurse, had married her second husband without knowing he had venereal disease this would explain why she became an anti-VD campaigner and promoted pre-marital health checks and sex education for children.

The association produced several booklets to further these aims, including "What Parents Should Tell Their Children" and "Sex in Life: Young Women".  The RHA claimed to have published the booklets but they were really produced in London by the British Social Hygiene Council in the 1920s and were reissued by the RHA in the 1930s (without permission).  They are: "Sex in Life: Young Men", by Douglas White and Dr Otto May; "Sex in Life: Young Women", by Violet D Swaisland and Mary B Douie, and "What Parents Should Tell Their Children", by Mary Scharlieb and Kenneth Wills.

The first birth control clinic in Sydney was founded by the association in 1933.

See also
Family planning
Eugenics
Racial hygiene
Social hygiene

References

Further reading
 

History of Australia (1901–1945)
Eugenics in Australia
Eugenics organizations
Birth control providers
Medical and health organisations based in Australia